Diadexia is a genus of moths of the family Crambidae.

Species
Diadexia anchylocrossa Turner, 1924
Diadexia argyropasta Turner, 1911
Diadexia parodes Turner, 1905

References

Crambinae
Crambidae genera
Taxa named by Alfred Jefferis Turner